A Double Winning is a 1915 American drama film featuring Harry Carey.

Cast
 Helen Bray
 Harry Carey
 Charles West (as Charles H. West)

See also
 List of American films of 1915
 Harry Carey filmography

External links

1915 films
1915 drama films
1915 short films
American silent short films
American black-and-white films
Silent American drama films
1910s American films